La Fin Du Monde is French for "The end of the world". It may refer to:

 La Fin du Monde (album), an album by The Hylozoists
 La Fin du Monde (beer), a beer brewed by Quebec brewery Unibroue
 La Fin du monde (book), a science fiction novel published in 1894 by Camille Flammarion and translated into English under the title Omega: The Last Days of the World
 La Fin du monde (film) (End of the World)), a 1931 film directed by Abel Gance
 La Fin du monde (film)|Cigarette Burns (film) (End of the World)), a fictional film which is the focus of the 2005 Masters of Horror episode Cigarette Burns

See also 
 La fin du monde est à 7 heures, a Quebec satirical news television show